GameFan (originally known as Diehard GameFan) was a publication started by Tim Lindquist, Greg Off, George Weising, and Dave Halverson in September 1992 that provided coverage of domestic and import video games. It was notable for its extensive use of game screenshots in page design, contrasting other U.S. publications at the time. The original magazine ceased publishing in December 2000. 

In April 2010, Halverson relaunched GameFan as a video games and film magazine. However, this relaunch was short-lived and suffered from internal conflicts and low advertising revenue.

History
The idea for the name GameFan came from the Japanese Sega magazine called Megafan. Although it began as an advertising supplement to sell imported video games, primarily from Japan, the small text reviews and descriptions drew attention for a lack of refinement and sense of passion. Editor profiles featured caricatures drawn by Terry Wolfinger. The anonymized approach allowed certain editors like Dave Halverson to write multiple reviews of the same game under different pseudonyms.

GameFan was well known for its extensive coverage of import games and its expansive coverage of emerging interest in anime. Another major feature that separated it from other gaming magazines was the high-quality paper used to print it. GameFan's game screenshots were more colorful and accurate to in-game graphics.

The downfall of GameFan is usually attributed to several factors. The primary cause was a series of lawsuits which targeted the magazine for most of its run (most stemming from investors who felt they had been cheated out of their money during the early years of the publication), following it through numerous corporate iterations and change of hands. A lawsuit prevented the sale of the print magazine and its continuation, derailing a deal.

After its dissolution, several staff members attempted to have the brand reinstated by the publisher of Computer Strategy Plus, based in Burlington, Vermont. A deal could not be reached and the magazine was shut down shortly thereafter in 2001.

Controversy
In the September 1995 issue of GameFan, an article was printed that contained several derogatory comments about Japanese people (calling them "little Jap bastards", a racially derogatory term that was used to insult Japanese descendants and Japanese Americans during the years of World War II). The text took the place of one of the paragraphs of one of the sports games reviews. The article discussed a Namco combat flight simulator, Ace Combat, rather than College Football '96 (which was the topic of the article) and was poorly written.

GameFan's official explanation was that a rogue employee had sabotaged the magazine in order to alienate its Japanese audience and fan-base. However, later reports indicated that it was actually filler text that someone had neglected to remove, and the entire incident was an internal joke that accidentally got printed. An apology (dated August 24, 1995) was published in DieHard GameFan's October 1995 issue in both English and Japanese, and a further apology appeared in the November 1995 issue.

The Adventures of Monitaur

The magazine included a comic strip, The Adventures of Monitaur, an anime-derived series. Although the title character Monitaur was only drawn for the strip, the rest of the magazine's staff personae appeared as characters. Monitaur's main storylines were his struggles against The Blowmeister, who represented the leadership of rival magazines such as Electronic Gaming Monthly. In 1994, GameFan and two new startups, known as Dark Moon Productions and Dark Moon Comics, entered into an agreement to launch a Monitaur comic book series, and at that time discussions were underway to make a full-length animated movie to be produced by Dark Moon Productions Inc and DMP Multi-media, a sister company founded by Andrew Spencer and Gary Tucker.

Golden Megawards 
The winners of GameFans annual Golden Megawards were chosen by editors.

Related publications
GameFan's original editor-in-chief, Dave Halverson, went on to publish Gamers' Republic, and then Play Magazine (an American video-gaming magazine, not to be confused with the English publication of the same name), consisting mostly of former GameFan and Gamers' Republic staff members. Gamers' Republic had a run of 35 issues and ceased publication in July 2001 when the dot-com bubble burst. Play had a more successful run of 97 issues until the publishing company filed for bankruptcy.

Tim Lindquist, along with several other members of the original GameFan team, launched a new magazine, Hardcore Gamer. They also began developing strategy guides as a part of their publishing company, DoubleJump Books (later renamed OnionBat Books). The magazine had a run of 36 issues before they began focusing exclusively on their website.

The DieHard GameFan name was resurrected by Alex Lucard as a website, Diehard GameFAN, with Halverson's blessing. While the site covers major game releases, the site also reviews indie games, much like the original magazine.

2010 relaunch

After the bankruptcy of Fusion Publishing and the closure of Play, Dave Halverson began work on a relaunch of GameFan. The magazine returned to newsstands in April 2010, headed by Halverson and a few key staffers from Play with Rob Duenas serving as the new art director. It was available in both print and digital formats, the latter of which was sold directly through GameFan's online shop.

The first two issues of the relaunched GameFan featured a section titled MovieFan, which covered movies, anime, and comics. The first two-thirds of the magazine were devoted to GameFan, and then readers would have to turn the magazine upside down in order to read the MovieFan magazine. As of issue 3, the MovieFan portion of the magazine was discontinued, but later issues still featured anime and comic reviews similar to Play. In its second and final issue, MovieFan conducted one of the last known interviews with late filmmaker Satoshi Kon.

The first five issues of the magazine were released on a consistent bi-monthly schedule. However, problems occurred with the magazine's development due to issues with advertising revenue, causing the sixth issue to be released in August 2011, eight months after issue 5, and with an entirely new editing team, headed by newcomer James Bacon. Issue 7 was assembled by only three people - editor-in-chief Dave Halverson, art director and graphic designer Rob Duenas, and managing editor James Bacon - and was released in December 2011. Soon thereafter Duenas resigned. The reason for his departure was due to an overwhelming workload; Duenas stated that he worked "20 hours a day for two weeks straight and [he was] still short cover art". Despite the stressful working conditions, Duenas harbored no ill will towards Halverson or the magazine, stating that he would have still been willing to contribute with cover illustrations or providing assistance with layouts. Soon after Duenas' departure, Bacon left for reasons unstated.

A press release was issued on April 18, 2012, highlighting the supposed future of Paper Planet brands: GameFan and Girls of Gaming. The company planned on increasing their online presence through app development for mobile devices as well as a new GameFan TV online channel. None of these plans would come to fruition except the creation of a YouTube channel. Former Destructoid editor Wesley Ruscher was named the magazine's new editor-in-chief but resigned shortly after the release of issue 8, stating that it "lacked the necessities to keep food in [his] belly and a roof over [his] head."

As of June 2013, GameFan's web presence had been in a mostly inactive state for about a year. Issue 9 was finally made available in February 2013 after missing the holiday 2012 release. This issue was only worked on by two people, Dave Halverson and Greg Orlando. Issues 8 and 9 were only available in a digital format. GameFan would later go on a two-year hiatus, returning in 2015 with a redesigned magazine and website. In February 2015, GameFan simultaneously released issue 10 digitally and in newsstands. The digital version was freely released on Magzter with the use of a promotional code. The magazine went through a complete overhaul, simplifying its layouts and design, most likely in order to have the magazines completed on schedule. The size of the print magazine is significantly smaller compared to previous issues. In addition, the GameFan mascot, Monitaur, and logo were redesigned.

On May 6, 2015, GameFan announced a partnership with Destructoid to help promote the GameFan brand with collaborations and free subscription offers. The initial plan was to bring back the dual-cover format from the first two issues, but instead of a MovieFan portion, it would be exclusive content created by Destructoid for the magazine. According to GameFan's official Facebook page, the deal with Destructoid would have allowed for the magazine to be released on a monthly schedule. However, the deal with Destructoid resulted in only one issue of the GameFan/Destructoid magazine ever being released. As of January 2019, there have been no new updates regarding GameFan's overall status.

References

External links
 GameFan's Official Site (In Archived Format)
 GameFan 2010's Website, before the redesign (In Archived Format)
 Hardcore Gaming 101's Archived GameFan History Thread
 VideoGameObsession's 100% Complete GameFan Issue Index
 The Original GameFan Website (In Archived Format)
Archived GameFan Magazines on the Wayback Machine 
Digitized GameFan magazine on Retro CDN

Monthly magazines published in the United States
Video game magazines published in the United States
Defunct computer magazines published in the United States
Irregularly published magazines published in the United States
Magazines established in 1992
Magazines disestablished in 2000
Magazines established in 2010
Magazines disestablished in 2015